"Gets Us All in the End" is a single by guitarist Jeff Beck, released in 1985 through Epic Records. The song is the second track from his fourth studio album Flash, and reached No. 20 on the U.S. Billboard Mainstream Rock chart.

Track listing

References

Jeff Beck songs
1985 songs
1985 singles
Epic Records singles
Songs written by Arthur Baker (musician)
Song recordings produced by Arthur Baker (musician)